Amata basithyris is a moth of the family Erebidae. It was described by George Hampson in 1914. It is found in Ghana, Sierra Leone and Uganda.

References

 

basithyris
Moths described in 1914
Moths of Africa